The Hong Kong Champion Stayer is an honour given in Hong Kong thoroughbred horse racing. It is awarded annually by the Hong Kong Jockey Club (HKJC).
The honour is part of the Hong Kong Jockey Club Champion Awards and is awarded at the end of the Hong Kong season in July.

Winners since 2001

References
Hong Kong Jockey Club News Archive

Horse racing awards
Horse racing in Hong Kong